A coefficient of utilization (CU) is a measure of the efficiency of a luminaire in transferring luminous energy to the working plane in a particular area. The CU is the ratio of luminous flux from a luminaire incident upon a work plane to that emitted by the lamps within the luminaire.  As a ratio, the coefficient of utilization is unitless.

For example, some of the light emitted by a luminaire may exit away from the desired plane and is therefore wasted. A CU measures the light actually reaching the desired plane as a percentage of the total light produced by the fixture. The value for direct lighting varies from 0.2 to 0.5 while that of indirect lighting varies from 0.1 to 0.3

See also
Luminous efficacy
Wall-plug efficiency

Photometry
Lighting